Natasha Wanganeen is an Aboriginal Australian actress. She is known for her starring role in the 2002 feature film Rabbit Proof Fence, aged 15, and numerous television roles. Her debut film as co-writer and co-producer is the 2022 short film, an Indigenous sci-fi drama entitled Bunker: The Last Fleet, about an alien invasion of Australia, in which she also takes the lead role.

Early life
Wanganeen was born in Point Pearce, South Australia, moving to Port Adelaide when she was five years old. She is a Ngarrindjeri, Narungga, Kaurna and Noongar woman.

Career
Wanganeen starred in Rabbit Proof Fence (released 2002), playing dormitory boss at the age of fifteen, and the made-for-TV film Jessica directed by Peter Andrikidis and released in 2004.

In 2017 she starred as a zombie-killer in the dystopian thriller Cargo. Also in 2017, she played the role of Gilyagan in Kate Grenville's play The Secret River presented during the Adelaide Festival in March, and later played a different role in the two-part TV series of the same name.

She played Mary, mother of a talented gymnast, in feature film A Second Chance: Rivals!, released in 2019, and in the same year played a ghoul in the horror film Dark Place.

In June 2020, Wanganeen was writing a script for her own independent film, Battle Of The Ancestors, set 60,000 years ago against a backdrop of Aboriginal mythology, including Dreamtime stories and characters she knows from here childhood years. She is being supported by Screen Australia and the South Australian Film Corporation in this endeavour, and is in talks with local production companies who are interested in seeing it made.

Wanganeen was on the jury for the Feature Fiction and Documentary awards at the 2020 Adelaide Film Festival.

Television roles include playing Mary Ann Bugg, a late 19th-century bushranger, in Drunk History Australia (Network 10, 2020) and a chef in Aftertaste (Closer Productions/ABC Comedy, 2021). She plays a government official in 2067, a sci-fi thriller feature film directed by Seth Larney released in 2020.

Originally intended as a sci-fi series, Bunker: The Last Fleet, co-written by Wanganeen, Stephen Potter, and Rowan Pullen, directed by the latter two, and co-produced by the three of them and others, was inspired by Afrofuturism. It was first released as a short film, with the intention of growing into a feature film. It had is Australian premiere at the St Kilda Film Festival in June 2022, with multiple screenings following around Australia (including Revelation Perth International Film Festival and Adelaide Film Festival) and internationally. Wanganeen plays Tjarra, an Aboriginal warrior in Australia 37 years in the future, and Kaurna elder Uncle Fred Agius plays the role of an elder. Trevor Jamieson (who is a cousin) gave cultural advice and also plays a role in the film. The film was filmed entirely in the South Australian desert. As the first Aboriginal sci-fi move, it is described as a "cheeky take on the First Fleet in Australia".

In 2023, she appeared in Ivan Sen's mystery, crime drama Limbo, which was nominated in 'competition section' at the 73rd Berlin International Film Festival, to be held from February 16 to 26, 2023.

Awards
2004 – AFI Young Actor's Award, for Jessica

Activism
In 2018, Wanganeen advocated for greater cultural diversity in Australian screen culture, saying "There are not enough black faces on our screens and talking about it is a constructive conversation that we need to have". She expressed her pleasure at the portrayal of Aboriginal people in Cargo (2017) as "living free and strong on the land".

Wanganeen was one of the organisers of the Black Lives Matter protest in Adelaide on 6 June 2020, which focussed on racism and injustices against Indigenous Australians, in particular high rates of incarceration and Aboriginal deaths in custody.

Personal life
 Wanganeen lives in Port Adelaide. She is related to Australian rules footballer Gavin Wanganeen, and actor and playwright  Trevor Jamieson is a cousin.

References

External links
 

Indigenous Australian actresses
Living people
People from South Australia
Year of birth missing (living people)